SMS  was a battlecruiser of the German  (Imperial Navy), the third ship of the , built to a slightly modified design. She carried the same battery of eight  guns, but in improved turrets that allowed them to fire further. The ship was also slightly larger and faster than her two sister ships. She was named in honor of Field Marshal Paul von Hindenburg, the victor of the Battle of Tannenberg and the Battle of the Masurian Lakes, as well as Supreme Commander of the German armies from 1916. The ship was the last capital ship of any type built for the German navy during World War I.

 was commissioned late in the war and as a result had a brief service career. The ship took part in a handful of short fleet operations as the flagship of I Scouting Group in 1917–18, though saw no major action. The proposed final sortie of the fleet in the last weeks of the war came to nothing when the crews of the capital ships mutinied.  was subsequently interned with the rest of the German battlecruisers at Scapa Flow in November 1918. Rear Admiral Ludwig von Reuter ordered the ships be scuttled on 21 June 1919.  was the last of the ships to sink. She was raised in 1930 and broken up for scrap over the following two years.

Design 

The  class was authorized for the 1911 fiscal year as part of the 1906 naval law; design work had begun in early 1910. To keep costs from growing too quickly, the number of guns was reduced from ten to eight, compared to the earlier , but a more efficient superfiring arrangement was adopted. , the third and final member of the class, was allocated to the 1913 construction program.

She had a crew of 44 officers and 1,068 men; when serving as the flagship for I Scouting Group, the ship carried an additional 14 officers and 62 men.  was propelled by four sets of steam turbines driving four screws; steam was provided by 14 coal-fired marine-type double boilers and eight oil-fired marine-type double-ended boilers.

s primary armament was eight 30.5 cm (12 in) guns in four twin turrets, the same as in her two sisters.

Her secondary casemates received  of armor protection. The forward conning tower, where the ship's commander controlled the vessel, had 300 mm walls.

Service history 

Designed as a replacement for the elderly protected cruiser , s keel was laid down on 30 June 1913. She was launched on 1 August 1915, but due to shifting construction priorities in time of war, she was not completed until 10 May 1917, by which time it was too late for her to see any significant operations in World War I. At the time, British naval intelligence believed the ship was commissioned so late because she had had parts removed to repair  after the battle of Jutland in June 1916. In actuality, construction proceeded slowly because of labor shortages.

 was the last battlecruiser completed for the Imperial German Navy, and as such had a very short career. However, the raid was brief; by the time  and  arrived on the scene, the British ships had broken off the attack and withdrawn. On 23 November,  replaced  as flagship of I Scouting Group.

Advance of 23 April 1918 
In late 1917, light forces of the High Seas Fleet began interdicting British convoys to Norway. On 17 October the light cruisers  and  intercepted one of the convoys, sinking nine of the twelve cargo ships and the two escorting destroyers— and —before turning back to Germany. On 12 December, four German destroyers ambushed a second British convoy of five cargo vessels and two British destroyers. All five transports were sunk, as was one of the destroyers. Following these two raids, Admiral David Beatty, the commander of the Grand Fleet, detached battleships from the battle fleet to protect the convoys. The German navy was now presented with an opportunity for which it had been waiting the entire war: a portion of the numerically stronger Grand Fleet was separated and could be isolated and destroyed. Vice Admiral Franz von Hipper planned the operation: the battlecruisers of I Scouting Group, along with light cruisers and destroyers, would attack one of the large convoys, while the rest of the High Seas Fleet would stand by, ready to attack the British dreadnought battleship squadron.

Hipper ordered wireless transmissions be kept to a minimum, to prevent British intelligence from receiving radio intercepts. At 06:10 the German battlecruisers had reached a position approximately 60 kilometers southwest of Bergen, when  lost her inner starboard propeller. Without resistance from the water, the propeller-less shaft began spinning faster and faster, until one of the engine gears flew apart. Shrapnel from the broken machinery damaged several boilers and tore a hole in the hull; the ship was dead in the water. However, it was decided to take the ship under tow by the battleship . Despite this setback, Hipper continued northward. By 14:00, Hipper's force had crossed the convoy route several times but had found nothing. At 14:10, Hipper turned his ships southward. By 18:37, the German fleet had made it back to the defensive minefields surrounding their bases. It was later discovered that the convoy had left port a day later than expected by the German planning staff.

Later planned operations 

On 11 August 1918, Hipper was promoted to Admiral and given command of the entire High Seas Fleet. Rear Admiral Ludwig von Reuter replaced Hipper as the commander of I Scouting Group; he raised his flag on  the following day.

 was to have taken part in what would have amounted to the "death ride" of the High Seas Fleet shortly before the end of World War I. The bulk of the High Seas Fleet was to have sortied from their base in Wilhelmshaven to engage the Grand Fleet; Admiral Reinhard Scheer intended to inflict as much damage as possible on the British navy, to achieve a better bargaining position for Germany whatever the cost to the fleet. The plan involved two simultaneous attacks by light cruisers and destroyers, one on Flanders and another on shipping in the Thames estuary;  and the other four battlecruisers were to support the Thames attack. After both strikes, the fleet was to concentrate off the Dutch coast, where it would meet the Grand Fleet in battle. While the fleet was consolidating in Wilhelmshaven, war-weary sailors began deserting en masse. As  and  passed through the locks that separated Wilhelmshaven's inner harbor and roadstead, some 300 men from both ships climbed over the side and disappeared ashore.

On 24 October 1918, the order was given to sail from Wilhelmshaven. In the face of open rebellion, the order to sail was rescinded and the planned operation was abandoned. In an attempt to suppress the mutiny, the High Seas Fleet squadrons were dispersed.

Fate 

Under the terms of the Armistice between Germany and the Allies that ended World War I, the majority of the German fleet was to be interned at Scapa Flow; this included  and the rest of the battlecruisers. On 21 November 1918, the ships to be interned—14 capital ships, seven light cruisers, and 50 of the most modern torpedo boats—departed German waters for what would prove to be the last time. Prior to the departure of the German fleet, Admiral Adolf von Trotha made clear to Reuter, who was given command of the ships to be interned, that he could not allow the Allies to seize the ships, under any conditions. The fleet rendezvoused with the British light cruiser , which led the ships to the Allied fleet that was to escort the Germans to Scapa Flow. The massive flotilla consisted of some 370 British, American, and French warships.

The fleet remained in captivity during the negotiations in Versailles that ultimately produced the treaty that ended the war. A copy of The Times informed Reuter that the Armistice was to expire at noon on 21 June 1919, the deadline by which Germany was to have signed the peace treaty. Reuter came to the conclusion that the British intended to seize the German ships after the Armistice expired. To prevent this, he decided to scuttle his ships at the first opportunity. On the morning of 21 June, the British fleet left Scapa Flow to conduct training maneuvers; at 11:20 Reuter transmitted the order to his ships.  was the last ship to sink, at 17:00. Her captain had deliberately arranged that the ship sank on an even keel to make it easier for her crew to escape. After several unsuccessful attempts, she was raised on 23 July 1930, only to be scrapped at Rosyth between 1930 and 1932.

Notes

Footnotes

Citations

References

Further reading
 
 
 
 
 

Derfflinger-class battlecruisers
World War I battlecruisers of Germany
1915 ships
Ships built in Wilhelmshaven
World War I warships scuttled at Scapa Flow
Maritime incidents in 1919
Paul von Hindenburg